Michael Matricciani (born 15 March 1986) is a former Australian footballer who currently coaches Adelaide University Soccer Club in State League 2 of the Football South Australia National Premier Leagues competition.

Matricciani coached Adelaide City in the National Premier League until the end of the 2020 season. Prior to this, Matricciani spent three years as head coach of Football SA NTC Girls and was awarded the 2018 Bob Bush Trophy, recognising the Women's National Premier League's Coach of the Year. He also served as Technical Director at the Campbelltown City Soccer Club from 2013 to 2016 and has undertaken study visits to Chievo Verona, Inter Milan and FC Barcelona.

Club career
He played for Adelaide United in the newly formed Hyundai A-League's inaugural season, but was delisted in the close of the 06/07 season. Michael also has a younger brother who is also a footballer named Dominic.

On 3 September 2011 it was announced that he had signed with I-League club Chirag United. He scored his first goal for Chirag on 28 October 2011 against Mohun Bagan.

References

1986 births
Living people
Soccer players from Adelaide
Australian people of Italian descent
A-League Men players
FFSA Super League players
Australian soccer players
Adelaide United FC players
National Premier Leagues players
North Eastern MetroStars SC players
Association football forwards
Chirag United Club Kerala players
Australian expatriate soccer players
Expatriate footballers in India